Fulham Cross Academy is a coeducational secondary school and sixth form located in the Fulham area of the London Borough of Hammersmith and Fulham, England. It is a STEM specialist school.

History 
It was previously known as Henry Compton Secondary School but reopened as Fulham College Boys' School in September 2012.

Previously a foundation school administered by Hammersmith and Fulham London Borough Council, in March 2013 Fulham College Boys' School converted to academy status. The school is now sponsored by the Fulham Cross Academy Trust.

In September 2020 the school was renamed Fulham Cross Academy and accepted girls for the first time, becoming coeducational. The main kingwood building is Grade II listed and has been refurbished from 2020 to 2021.

Results 
The school's result has continuously been ranked one of the best in London. 99 per cent of boys achieved five A*-C grades in 2013, up 23 per cent from three years ago.  64 per cent achieved 5 A*-C  grades, including English and maths. That compares with 49% of students who got five or more GCSEs at A*-C, including English and maths. This is now well above the national average and shows outstanding student progress. The school this year has had particularly outstanding results in science (100% of students achieved A*-C in Chemistry, Physics and Biology) and Languages (92% A*-C in Spanish).

Facilities 
Facilities include specialist science and design and technology blocks, a multi-use Astroturf sports pitch and gym on site and a fully equipped performing arts centre.

Sixth form 
Fulham Cross Academy operates a sixth form provision in conjunction with Fulham Cross Girls' School. The sixth form is housed in a building that was formerly Fulham Enterprise Studio.

Notable former pupils

Henry Compton School 
 Shaun Bailey, Conservative parliamentary candidate
 Linford Christie, track athlete
 George Cohen, played for Fulham F.C. and England, the right full back in the 1966 World Cup Final
 Ade Coker, footballer
 Jody Morris, footballer, midfield for Chelsea
 Paul Mortimer, footballer, midfield for Charlton Athletic
 Roy Williams, playwright

References

External links 
 

Secondary schools in the London Borough of Hammersmith and Fulham
Academies in the London Borough of Hammersmith and Fulham